Shady Side Academy is an independent preparatory school located in the Borough of Fox Chapel (suburban Pittsburgh), and in the Point Breeze neighborhood of Pittsburgh, Pennsylvania. Founded in 1883 as an all-male night school in the Shadyside neighborhood of Pittsburgh, the academy now offers a secular coeducational PK–12 program on four campuses in the city and its suburbs, including a boarding program in the Croft and Morewood Houses of its Senior School Campus.

Formed to provide for the education of the sons of newly moneyed industrialists of Pittsburgh's East End, the academy counts the Frick and Mellon families among its early patrons. In 1922 the academy expanded to its sprawling Georgian Senior School campus in the then-countryside of Fox Chapel under the influence of the Country Day School movement. The academy merged with the Arnold School in 1940 to form its Junior School campus and added its stone Tudor manor-style Middle School campus in 1958, emerging in its current three-school system. The academy admitted its first female students in 1973. The school has in recent years demonstrated a vigorous commitment to diversity and financial accessibility.

Shady Side Academy enrolls approximately one thousand students annually and is a member of the National Association of Independent Schools and the Association of Boarding Schools. The school is a member of the Chewonki Foundation's Maine Coast Semester at Chewonki in Wiscasset, Maine, CITYterm at the Masters' School, and the High Mountain Institute's HMI Semester in Leadville, Colorado, and sends a significant number of students to both programs annually. The academy competes locally with Oakland Catholic High School, the Ellis School, the Winchester Thurston School, and Central Catholic High School, as well as regionally with schools such as The Kiski School and Sewickley Academy, and its lower schools are compared to local primary schools St. Edmund's Academy and the Falk Laboratory School. Historic rivals from the former Independent School Preparatory League (IPSL) include Western Reserve Academy, University School, Linsly School, Nichols School, Cranbrook Schools, and The Kiski School. The school's colors are navy blue and old gold.

Niche.com consistently ranks Shady Side Academy as the #1 Private K-12 School in the Pittsburgh Area.

Shady Side Academy's mission is to "challenge students to think expansively, act ethically and lead responsibly."

History 

Shady Side Academy was founded as an all-male day school in 1883, on Aiken Avenue in the East End neighborhood of Shadyside, Pittsburgh. In 1922, the Senior School was established on its current suburban campus in Fox Chapel. This move also resulted in Shady Side becoming a boarding school, first with a traditional seven-day program and, later, with the school's weekday program.

A later merger in the early 1940s with another local boys' private school, The Arnold School, resulted in the creation of another new campus: a Junior School, located in Pittsburgh's Point Breeze and serving Pre-kindergarten through fifth grade students.

In the 1950s, the academy purchased an estate less than a mile from the Senior School campus, creating a middle school for grades six through eight.

In 1973, the Senior School embraced the concept of co-education. It began admitting female students (popularly referred to, particularly in newspapers, as "The Shady Ladies") for the first time. The Junior and Middle Schools followed suit in the 1990s, with the first K-12 "Lifer" female students graduating in 2007. The last all-male class at the academy was the Middle School Form II (eighth grade) class of 1998, which became co-educated upon entering the Senior School in 1999. It was also the last class at the Middle School to follow a tie and jacket dress code.

Opening in the fall of 2007, Shady Side added a pre-kindergarten located on the Junior School campus. The total enrollment across all grades fluctuates but is generally about 1000 students, with about 500 of them enrolled in the Senior School (grades 9-12 or "Forms" III-VI).

In recent years, the school has worked to implement "green," or environmentally friendly, changes to its campuses. The 2006 renovation of Rowe Hall, the main academic building, uses several "green" concepts. The $6.8 million renovation of this primary Senior School facility emphasized environmentally friendly approaches, from glass that allows more light into classrooms (allowing the building to maintain lower electricity usage levels) to rainwater collected in an underground cistern, then used to flush toilets and urinals. In the fall of 2007, the Rowe Hall Complex earned Gold LEED (Leadership in Energy and Environmental Design) Certification, becoming the only high school in the Commonwealth of Pennsylvania to have done so.

The McIlroy Center for Science and Innovation opened in 2018 as the new home of the Senior School Science Department. The building's construction was made possible by the fundraising efforts of The Campaign for Shady Side. The Mcllroy Center is a Gold LEED-certified "green" building with sustainable features that reduce environmental impact while creating teaching opportunities, such as a rooftop solar array and monitoring system and a rain garden to collect storm runoff. The Glimcher Tech & Design Hub, a dynamic facility dedicated to innovation, creativity, technology, and design, opened at the Senior School in September 2019. The 12,000-square-foot space includes three primary areas: a Fabrication and Robotics Wing, a Computer Science Wing, and a café. The facility is on the lower levels of Rowe and Memorial Halls, in the space formerly occupied by the Science Department, before moving to the new  McIlroy Center for Science & Innovation in 2018.

Admissions

Demographics

Financial aid
In 2013, over $2.8 million in need-based financial aid was distributed to 159 students. In 2019, Shady Side received the second-largest gift in its 136-year history, a $5.2 million gift to the financial aid endowment.

Curriculum 

Academic life at Shady Side Academy operates on a trimester system, dividing the year into three thirteen to fourteen-week terms. Classes begin each year before Labor Day with Convocation in late August and finish with Commencement exercises in early June. The Second Term begins in late November, and Third Term begins in early April. At the Senior School, regular classes begin each day at 8:15 a.m. and end at 3:00 p.m., punctuated by a late-morning assembly period. All-school assemblies occur every Monday and Friday in the Hillman Center's Rauh Theater. Every Wednesday, students meet with their advisory groups. The academic day is divided into six periods filled with at least five classes, a lunch period, and intermittent free periods. Athletic practices follow the school day from 3:45 p.m. to late afternoon. An eight-day rotating schedule determines class periods.

Each term, students enroll in a minimum of five classes, both year-long courses and one-term electives, taught by seven academic departments—Arts, Computer Science, English, History, Mathematics, Science, and World Languages. Many departments, particularly the English and History Departments, make extensive use of the Harkness table, as most rooms in Rowe have large, oval tables. This teaching style is similar to the Socratic method. Students receive midterm grade reports during the year's first term and subsequently after each term, followed by a cumulative grade report at the end of the year. The grade for each class has three parts—a letter grade, an effort grade, and a paragraph of written remarks. The quality grade, assigned on the A+ (4.3333) to F (0.0) scale, is used to calculate the student's GPA. Effort grades for each class consist of a number from 5, indicating "exemplary effort," to 1, indicating "unacceptable effort." Effort grades of 2—"inconsistent effort"— or below result in a student's placement on Academic Warning and likely an interim report to the student's parents. The academy uses the student's GPA and effort grades each term and at the end of the year to award academic Year and Term Honors, ranging from "Honors" (B+ average) to "Highest Honors" (A average), as well as other school and departmental prizes. Established in 1929, Shady Side Academy's chapter of the Cum Laude Society elects members from the top fifth of the graduating class based on academic performance in the junior year and the first two terms of the senior year.

Academic and personal counseling 
The Senior School campus offers college, academic, and personal counseling through a variety of resources. Every upper-form student is assigned a personal college counselor to navigate the college applications process. College counselors help students write applications and choose between offers of admission through regular meetings in the Kassling College Counseling Center in Rowe Hall. Every student graduating from Shady Side proceeds to study at a four-year college or university. The academy's advisory program also provides every student with a year-long academic advisor. Students are assigned a new advisor specific to their form for each academic year. Each advisor supervises an advisory group of approximately 5 to 6 students. Advisory groups meet as a homeroom once each week, usually to share a midday snack and read the week's announcements, and sit together at least twice a week in all-school assemblies. Each student also meets individually with their advisor during a free period to discuss their academic life and any academic difficulties they may be having. Advisors meet with their advisees' parents twice every year and write reports summarizing their advisees' academic and personal progress—which form one part of each student's grade report—at the end of each term. An on-campus personal counselor is also available.

Academic and personal counseling is offered at the Middle School. Students are assigned an advisor and meet in homerooms regularly, as well as in weekly all-school assemblies. Each term, a conference with the student, parent(s), and advisor is held to discuss the student's progress, achievements and challenges.

The Junior School provides personal counseling and academic counseling in reading, math, and overall learning support. All-school assemblies are held weekly. Each student has at least one opportunity per academic year to speak in front of the school assemblies starting in Pre-Kindergarten. This provides early experience in public speaking and helps students, at a young age, to overcome the fear associated with speaking in front of a large group of people in a supportive, non-judgmental environment. In preparation for the Middle School, fifth-grade students serve as leaders in the school, giving tours to prospective families, assisting students in getting on and off the bus in the morning and afternoon, and leading assemblies. These additional responsibilities help prepare them for the transition to Middle School.

Boarding program and residential life
Boarding at Shady Side Academy dates back to the school's relocation from the Shadyside neighborhood in the 1920s. The number of boarding students living on campus and the number of buildings serving as dormitories has fluctuated over the academy's history. Four buildings on the Senior School campus—Bayard House (1924), Croft House (1931), Ellsworth House (1922) (now Hunt Hall), and Morewood House (1922)—all served as residence halls at one point in the school's history. The names of Bayard, Morewood, and Ellsworth Houses reference three out of the four streets encircling the site of the academy's original campus, now the site of the Winchester Thurston School. At one time, nearly 200 students, both Senior and Middle School students, boarded full-time in a seven-day boarding program. In the 1960s, the academy transitioned to housing Senior School students in a five-day boarding program, one of six schools nationwide to offer such a program to its students. Because students spend weekends at home, boarders almost always came from the three-state area of eastern Ohio, western Pennsylvania, and northern West Virginia. In the fall of 2014, the academy announced it would start offering a seven-day boarding option beginning in 2015, in addition to its current five-day boarding program. Shady Side's boarding program now hosts approximately fifty students every year in two residence halls—Croft House, the boys' dormitory, and Morewood House, the girls' dormitory. The academy also houses residential faculty representing almost every academic department, both in apartments in the dormitories and homes on the Senior and Middle School campuses.

Extracurricular activities
Student-run clubs at Shady Side exist as collaborations between students and a sponsoring faculty member. Numerous language clubs exist in collaboration with language programs offered by the World Languages Department, such as the German, Spanish, and French clubs, and for languages not taught at Shady Side, such as the Italian Club. Nationality clubs, such as the Jewish Student Union and Black Student Union, celebrate various global cultures and often present performances during the academy's annual GlobalFest week. There are also many established service and philanthropic clubs, such as Service Learning and Meals on Wheels. There are also religious clubs, activist clubs, academic competition teams, student government organizations, performance groups, departmental programs such as the peer-tutoring Scribe Office for writing, and publications.

Academic 
Shady Side participates in Model United Nations conferences, National Academic Quiz Tournaments and other quiz bowl competitions, the Western Pennsylvania Math League, Science Olympiad, North American Computational Linguistics Open competition, National Science Bowl, and forensics competitions, principally in the National Forensics League. The academy has sent a team annually to the Pittsburgh Regional event of the FIRST Robotics Competition since 2008. In 2003, 2005, 2006, and 2007, Shady Side was the season champion of Pittsburgh-based game show Hometown High-Q. The team finished fifth overall at the 2006 NAQT Nationals. Shady Side Academy's Speech and Debate team competes principally in the National Forensics League and regularly sends students to the National Catholic Forensics League and the Pennsylvania High School Speech League. The Shady Side Academy Speech and Debate team is coached by Mary Krauland, who has won multiple coaching awards, and Jacki Weaver assists with speech competitors and running the club.

In 2004, Shady Side Middle School placed third in the nation at the National Science Olympiad Tournament at Juniata College, a tournament with over fifty schools from all around the nation. After placing first at both the Regional and State Science Olympiad Tournament, they earned a position in the National tournament. In 2005, the team also placed first in the Regional and State Science Olympiad Tournaments, which got them into the National Tournament again, held in the University of Illinois. The team placed ninth at the national tournament. In the 2007 State Tournament, Shady Side's team placed second as runners up to Sewickley Academy, once again securing a place in the 2007 National Science Olympiad Tournament in Wichita, Kansas. Also, in 2009 the Middle School team placed second in the state tournament at Juniata College. They later placed 20th in the nation at Augusta State University in Georgia, in which 60 teams participated. In 2011 the Middle School team returned to Nationals at Madison, Wisconsin, placing 18th in the nation. In 2012, the team placed 26th at the national competition held at the University of Central Florida in Orlando, Florida. In 2013, the Middle School team won the Pennsylvania State Tournament for the second year in a row. They placed 11th, missing tenth place by just one point, at Nationals at Wright State University. They won for the third consecutive year in 2014, placing 14th at Nationals.

The Pittsburgh Japanese School (ピッツバーグ日本語補習授業校 Pittsubāgu Nihongo Hoshū Jugyō Kō), a weekend supplementary Japanese school, uses the middle school facilities of Shady Side Academy. The school, established in 1993, originated from a group of parents starting a Japanese class system in 1977.

Arts, theater, and music 
Since 2003, Shady Side has sponsored a benefit concert called "Untucked"—an homage to the school dress code, which, before 2004, required all shirts to be tucked in. Members of the Untucked Committee include students selected annually from a competitive applicant pool and a faculty member. Recent bands to appear at Untucked include Rusted Root, The Clarks, Robert Randolph and the Family Band, Better than Ezra and Sister Hazel. Untucked is usually held at the end of the year in the Roy McKnight Hockey Center and includes food and carnival games.

Shady Side Academy's main theater, the 650-seat Richard E. Rauh Theater, is named after the local teacher, actor, and arts patron Richard Rauh. It resides in the newly constructed Hillman Center for Performing Arts on the Senior School campus. There is also a blackbox theater (The Kountz Theater), which holds many smaller productions, such as the annual Fall Play and the Spring Original Works Theatre Festival. Recent theater performances include: Grease, An Enemy of the People, West Side Story, A Midsummer Night's Dream, The Music Man, Romeo and Juliet, Kiss Me, Kate, and The Importance of Being Earnest. The debut musical in the Hillman Center for the Performing Arts was Oliver!, which took place in the spring of 2005, starring Danielle Papincak (Nancy, Class of '05) and Bernard Balbot (Fagin, Class of '05). In 2006, the academy launched the Hillman Performing Arts Series with the Golden Dragon Acrobats, River City Brass Band, and Pittsburgh Ballet Theatre.

Publications
The academy's campus newspaper, the Shady Side News, is written and produced by an editorial staff of Senior School students and releases five issues each academic year. It contains campus news, commentary, political opinion, and photographs. The Academian, the Shady Side Academy yearbook, has been published annually since the school's founding by a committee of student editors. The Egerian, the school's literary magazine, publishes student-written prose and poetry at the end of each academic year. Established in 1928, it is released exclusively online by a committee of student editors. It is available at  Angles, the school's other literary magazine, collects the best of student-written nonfiction and also publishes—in print—at the end of every year. A science magazine, SSA Frontiers of Science, helps relay significant scientific advances to the community; it is produced once per term under the leadership of a student committee. The Forum, a collaboration between the Senior School History Department and a committee of student editors, contains political commentary and policy analysis.

Athletics 

The academy's athletic department mandates athletic participation for every student each term as a graduation requirement. Underform students participate in two terms of team sports and academic health classes, and upper form students participate in either a team sport or a physical education elective each term. Owing to the academy's extensive athletic facilities, the Athletic Department offers various options each term. The Senior School's facilities contain two gymnasiums, the McKnight Ice Hockey Center, baseball, soccer, and football fields, a cross-country course, two fitness facilities, squash and tennis courts, and an outdoor track. The Middle and Junior School campuses also both contain gymnasiums and playing fields.

Mascot
Shady Side Academy's athletic teams formerly competed as the Indians. Once known simply as the Blue & Gold, the Indians name replaced the original in the 1940s. Attempts to change the mascot due to conflict over the propriety of Native American images as athletic mascots, were long thwarted by various alumni, who argued for the academy's unique claim to its use, owing to Chief Guyasuta's historical encampment on the land now occupied by the Senior School. As of July 1, 2020, the board of trustees voted unanimously to retire the mascot and cease using Indians as a team name. Later that year, the board announced that the Bulldogs would be the new team name and mascot.

History

Athletic activity and physical education at the academy originate in the school's 1885 relocation within Shadyside from its original one-room schoolhouse on Aiken Avenue to a more spacious physical plant on Ellsworth Avenue, which included the addition of athletic playing fields and a gymnasium. The academy's early athletic program was organized to promote the ideals of its day, particularly amateurism in sport and the spirit of Muscular Christianity. Team sports, initially informal organizations of students and occasionally faculty, became increasingly structured as the academy developed athletic links and interscholastic competitions with nearby public and private secondary schools and, occasionally, colleges such as Washington & Jefferson College and what is now Duquesne University. To further formalize interscholastic competition, in 1907, the academy collaborated with Fifth Avenue High School, Allegheny Prep, and Pittsburgh Central High School to found the Western Pennsylvania Interscholastic Athletic League (WPIAL), which served to establish "a set of eligibility rules and regulations to ensure a level playing field for interscholastic athletic competition among the schools in western Pennsylvania." Long-standing Academy headmaster William R. Crabbe played a central role in the WPIAL's foundation and served as its first president.

The academy maintained its WPIAL association until 1924, when it withdrew its membership and collaborated with the University School of Cleveland, Ohio and Nichols School of Buffalo, New York to found the Tri-State Preparatory League. This league later added the Cranbrook School in Bloomfield Hills, Michigan, Western Reserve Academy in Hudson, Ohio, The Kiski School in Saltsburg, Pennsylvania, and the Linsly School in Wheeling, West Virginia, and in the mid-1930s began calling itself the Inter-State Preparatory League (IPSL). After seventy years of competition for the annual "Championship Cup," Shady Side Academy withdrew from the "crumbling" IPSL in 1993.

Affiliations
Since 1994 the academy has been a member of the WPIAL, which contains hundreds of other public and private secondary schools in western Pennsylvania and serves as District 7 of the Pennsylvania Interscholastic Athletic Association (PIAA), a state-level athletic governing body. Although most teams now compete at the varsity level in the WPIAL and PIAA, a minority of programs maintain prep-level affiliations in smaller sport-specific Prep Leagues consisting of other regional independent schools. The boys' prep hockey team served in 1990 as a founding member of the Midwest Prep Hockey League, in which it competes at the Division I level. It also occasionally plays semi-professional hockey clubs in Germany and Italy, including ESV Kaufbeuren, SV Kaltern, and EV Landsberg. The girls hockey team also competes at the prep level in the Women's Interscholastic Hockey League of the Mid-Atlantic. The boys and girls squash teams, members of the Pittsburgh Squash Racquet Association, are also prep-level teams composed of top-rated junior players. The boys lacrosse team participates in WPIAL and the Midwest Scholastic Lacrosse Association. Shady Side Academy teams also often compete on an informal basis with other local schools, including Sewickley Academy, Fox Chapel Area High School, Winchester Thurston School, and The Ellis School.

WPIAL and PIAA championships
Since joining the PIAA, the academy has won 12 state championships—two in boys' basketball (1995 and 2000), two in girls' golf (2008 and 2011), two in boys' swimming (2000 and 2011), two in girls' tennis (2007 and 2010), and two in boys' tennis (2003 and 2014)—along with numerous regional WPIAL championships in baseball, soccer, field hockey, tennis, swimming, football, and golf. The girls' tennis and field hockey teams won the WPIAL Championship titles in 2005, 2006, and 2007 for AAA and AA, respectively. The girls' tennis team went on to place second in the 2007 PIAA Championships and first in the 2008 PIAA Championships. Shady Side's Lauren Greco also won the PIAA and WPIAL AAA girls' tennis singles championships. The girls' tennis team won the  WPIAL and state championships in 2010, while Sara Perelman placed second individually. In 2010, the boys' swim team won the WPIAL championship for the ninth consecutive year (10th in 11 years). In addition, the wrestling team went on to place first in the PIAA Individual Championships of the 2007–2008 season, with both Dane Johnson placing first (his second time) and Roman San Doval placing first in the PIAA. They defended their state championship in wrestling with another championship in the 2008–2009 season. Johnson won his third PIAA Championship, and Matt Cunningham placed second in his weight class. Shady Side Academy wrestling is the first AA team in the WPIAL to have won the PIAA State Championship. The boys' tennis team won the WPIALs in 2010 and also placed second in states. Chris Mengel won the individual state championships as well in 2010.

WPIAL Team Championships (62 titles, 15 sports)
Boys Baseball: 2009
Boys Basketball: 1999, 2022
Boys Cross Country: 1994, 1997, 1998, 1999
Girls Cross Country: 2008
Girls Field Hockey: 1993, 1994, 1995, 1996, 1998, 1999, 2000, 2005, 2006, 2007, 2009, 2011, 2012, 2013, 2018, 2019, 2020, 2021
Boys Football: 1998
Girls Golf: 2008, 2009, 2011
Girls Lacrosse: 2019, 2021
Boys Soccer: 2017, 2018
Girls Soccer: 2010, 2013, 2019
Boys Swimming: 2000, 2002, 2003, 2004, 2005, 2006, 2007, 2008, 2009, 2010
Boys Tennis: 1999, 2002, 2003, 2010, 2012, 2013, 2014
Girls Tennis: 1993, 2006, 2007, 2008, 2010
Boys Track & Field: 1998, 1999
Boys Wrestling: 2001

PIAA Team Championships (13 titles, 7 sports)
Boys Basketball: 1995, 2000
Girls Golf: 2008, 2011
Boys Swimming: 2000, 2011
Boys Tennis: 2003, 2014
Girls Tennis: 2007, 2010
Boys Wrestling: 2008, 2009
Girls Soccer: 2017

Campuses 
Shady Side Academy has four campuses in Pittsburgh with almost , predominantly in heavily wooded Fox Chapel. Shady Side Academy operates twenty-six campus buildings with a total estimated facilities value of $56.2 million.

 Senior School: (Grades 9–12) 423 Fox Chapel Road, Pittsburgh 
 Middle School: (Grades 6–8)  100 Benedum Lane, Pittsburgh 
 Junior School: (Grades Pre-K to 5) 400 S. Braddock Avenue, Pittsburgh 
 Country Day School: (Grades Pre-K to 5) 400 Christ Church Lane, Pittsburgh

Notable alumni

 Tunde Adebimpe (1993), actor, director, and lead singer of the alternative rock band TV on the Radio
 Peter Ackerman (1988), Hollywood screenwriter on the animated film Ice Age and voice actor on Ice Age and Ice Age: The Meltdown.
 Hervey Allen (1909), author of many works of fiction and nonfiction, including most famously the 1933 novel Anthony Adverse
 Jerome "Jay" Apt (1967), astronaut on the Space Shuttle Atlantis
 Eugene Baker (1994), former NFL wide receiver 
 Jon Beckerman (1987), producer and creator of NBC comedy-drama Ed and ABC comedy The Knights of Prosperity
 Christian Borle (1991), Tony Award winner for featured actor in a play ("Peter and the Starcatcher", 2012) and Drama Desk Award-nominated Broadway actor. Starred in the NBC drama Smash.
 Richard G. Colbert (1933), U.S. Navy four-star admiral
 Charlie Cheever (1999), co-founder of Quora 
 Dave Dameshek (1988), American television writer and radio personality
 Tim DeChristopher (2000), environmental activist and founder of environmental group Peaceful Uprising.
 Thomas Mellon Evans (1927), financier and one of the early corporate raiders 
 Chris Frantz (1970), drummer for Talking Heads
 Childs Frick (1901), invertebrate paleontologist and son of Pittsburgh industrialist Henry Clay Frick
 Carmen Gentile (1992), journalist, author, and public speaker
 Bartley P. Griffith (1966), internationally renowned surgeon; performed first heart transplant from a genetically modified pig to a human patient; invented first "out of hospital" artificial lung 
 Kerry Hannon (1978), writer for U.S. News & World Report and USA Today
 Henry Hillman (1937), American billionaire businessman, investor, civic leader, and philanthropist
 Philip Hench (1912), winner of the Nobel Prize for Medicine in 1950 
 Edgar J. Kaufmann (1903), businessman and philanthropist, owner of Kaufmann's Department Store, and commissioner of Frank Lloyd Wright's Fallingwater in the Laurel Highlands
 Zachary D. Kaufman (1996), law professor, political scientist, and social entrepreneur
 Thornton Oakley (1897), artist, illustrator, and travel writer for Harper's Magazine and Scribner's Magazine
 David A. Reed (1896), Pennsylvania United States senator from 1922 to 1935
 Philip B. Heymann (1950), Harvard Law School professor, federal prosecutor, Associate Special Counsel in Watergate investigations, Deputy Attorney General 
 Richard Isay, psychiatrist, psychoanalyst, author, gay activist
 Carl Kurlander (1978), Hollywood screenwriter of the film St. Elmo's Fire and NBC sitcom Saved by the Bell
 Benjamin Lawsky (1988), New York State's first Superintendent of Financial Services, Chief of Staff to NY Governor Andrew Cuomo
 Aarti Mann (1996), television actress on CBS sitcom The Big Bang Theory
 Bill Marsh (1976), New Hampshire state representative for Carroll County's 8th district
 Paul Martha (1960), NFL football player for the Pittsburgh Steelers and Denver Broncos
 Lenny McAllister (1989), 2016 Republican nominee for US House of Representatives in Pittsburgh (PA 14th), political commentator, and activist
 David McCullough (1951), two-time Pulitzer Prize-winning author and historian
 Skyy Moore (2019), NFL Receiver, Kansas City Chiefs 
 Candace Otto (1998), operatic soprano and Miss Pennsylvania 2003
 David Puth (1974), financial services executive
 John B. Taylor (1964), Under Secretary of the Treasury for the George H. W. Bush administration
 David Wecht (1980), Associate Justice of the Supreme Court of Pennsylvania
 Christian K. Wedemeyer (1986), elected official of the Illinois Green Party and professor of the history of religions at the University of Chicago
 Bari Weiss (2002), New York Times opinion writer, and staff editor 
 Tom Vilsack (1968), current US Secretary of Agriculture, 40th governor of Iowa and 30th Secretary of Agriculture
 Jonathan Zittrain (1987), co-founder the Berkman Center for Internet & Society at Harvard Law School and Professor of Internet Governance and Regulation, Oxford University

References

External links
 Official Site

High schools in Pittsburgh
Middle schools in Pittsburgh
Private elementary schools in Pennsylvania
Private middle schools in Pennsylvania
Private high schools in Pennsylvania
Preparatory schools in Pennsylvania
Educational institutions established in 1883
1883 establishments in Pennsylvania
Boarding schools in Pennsylvania